Maj Gen Chris  Venter was a South African Army general officer from the artillery who served as the last Chief of Army Staff Planning (GS6).

Military career 

He joined the South African Defence Force  and served at 14 Field Regiment, 4 Field Regiment and the School of Artillery where he was a Chief Instructor Gunnery in 1974. He was involved in Operation Savannah in 1975-76. He was appointed as OC 4 Artillery Regiment from 1978 to 1980. He served as Director of Artillery from 1983-1986. Brigadier Venter served as Director Management Services and after promotion to the rank of major general, he served as Chief of Army Staff Pop Planning for the SANDF in 1997 to 1998. He retired from the SANDF in 1998.

Honours and awards

Medals

Proficiency badges

References 

South African military officers
Living people
Year of birth missing (living people)
South African Army generals
Afrikaner people
South African people of Dutch descent
South African military personnel of the Border War